The Oral Roberts Golden Eagles women's basketball team is the basketball team of Oral Roberts University in Tulsa, Oklahoma. The team is a member of The Summit League.

History
As of the end of the 2020–21 season, the Golden Eagles have a 708–651 all-time record. They participated in the Mid-Con from 1997–2007, the Summit League from 2007–2012, the Southland Conference from 2012–2014 before joining the Summit League again in 2014. They also made the WNIT in 2010, 2011, and 2012 along with the WBI in 2015.

NCAA tournament results

Season–by–season results

Notes

References

External links